Grant Knox (born 1960) is a former Scottish international lawn and indoor bowler.

He won a gold medal in the pairs with George Adrain at the 1986 Commonwealth Games in Edinburgh.

References

Living people
Scottish male bowls players
1960 births
Commonwealth Games medallists in lawn bowls
Commonwealth Games gold medallists for Scotland
Bowls players at the 1986 Commonwealth Games
Medallists at the 1986 Commonwealth Games